Cooper Point (also known as Cooper Poynt) is a neighborhood in the northwestern part of Camden, New Jersey, United States. According to the 2000 U.S. Census, the neighborhood has a population of 2,880. It is north of Cooper Grant and the Central Waterfront the other neighborhoods located near the Benjamin Franklin Bridge.  

The yards of Weeks Marine and the site of the former Riverfront State Prison are located along the Delaware River. In May 2013, the New Jersey Economic Development Authority announced that it would seek developers for the site. In September 2013, Waterfront Renaissance Associates announced that it proposed to build the Riverfront World Trade Center, a development of 2.3-million-square-foot campus on 16 acres on the site. The project  would be built in four phases, the first of which would be a promenade along the Delaware River.

See also
Benjamin Cooper House
Joseph Cooper House
Penn-Jersey Shipbuilding Corp.
John H. Mathis & Company
United States lightship Barnegat (LV-79)

References

External links
Unrealzed developmnent scheme

Neighborhoods in Camden, New Jersey